Hollis is both a surname and a given name. Notable people with the name include:

Surname
 Adrian Hollis (1940–2013), English classical scholar and correspondence chess grandmaster.
 Andy Hollis, American game designer
 Barry Hollis English rugby league footballer
 Charles Hollis, British architect
 Christopher Hollis (politician) (1902–1977), British schoolmaster, university teacher, author and Conservative politician
 Crispian Hollis, English Roman Catholic bishop
 Dwayne Hollis (born 1989), American football player
 Francis Septimus Hollis (1884–1955), British clergyman and Bishop of Labuan and Sarawak 1938–1948.
 George Hollis (1833–1879), British soldier and recipient of the Victoria Cross
 Gerald Hollis (1919–2005), British Rugby player, Naval Officer and Church of England Priest 
 H. H. Hollis (1921–1977), American science fiction writer
 Harry Hollis (1913–1982), Welsh footballer
 Joe Hollis, American football and baseball coach
 John Hollis, British actor
 Lee Hollis, Scottish footballer
 Linda Hollis (born 1951), American historian
 Mark Hollis (English musician) (1955–2019), British musician
 Martin Hollis (video game designer), game designer
 Martin Hollis (philosopher) (1938–1998), English philosopher
 Mary Cal Hollis, American political candidate
 Mick Hollis, English footballer
 Mike Hollis, American football kicker
 Patrice Hollis, Playboy Playmate for September 2007
 Patricia Hollis (1941–2018), British politician
 Roger Hollis, British director of MI5
 Sam Hollis, British football manager
 Stanley Elton Hollis, British Army officer and World War II Victoria Cross recipient
 Thomas Hollis (disambiguation), the name of several benefactors to Harvard University
 Tommy Hollis, American actor

Given name
 Hollis Caswell, American educator
 Hollis Cline, American neuroscientist
 Hollis Frampton, experimental filmmaker
 Hollis French, American politician
 Hollis Robbins, American academic
 Hollis Thompson, professional basketball player
 Hollis Thurston, better known as Sloppy Thurston, American professional baseball pitcher
 Hollis (singer), given name Hollis Wong-Wear

See also
Holiš, surname